Kieran Merrilees (born 12 September 1989)  is a Scottish badminton player from BC Adliswil Zurich. He represented his country at the 2010, 2014, and 2018 Commonwealth Games. Merrilees educated retail management and marketing at the Open University, Scotland.

Achievements

BWF International Challenge/Series
Men's singles

 BWF International Challenge tournament
 BWF International Series tournament
 BWF Future Series tournament

References

External links

 

1989 births
Living people
Sportspeople from Glasgow
Scottish male badminton players
Badminton players at the 2018 Commonwealth Games
Badminton players at the 2014 Commonwealth Games
Badminton players at the 2010 Commonwealth Games
Commonwealth Games competitors for Scotland